William Carlson may refer to:

William E. Carlson (1912–1999), American educator, businessman, and politician
William H. Carlson (1864–1937), American land developer and politician
William S. Carlson (1905–1994), academic administrator and president of four universities
Bill Carlson (1934–2008), American journalist and television anchor
Billy Carlson (1889–1915), American racecar driver.
Bill Carlson (footballer) (1885–1964), Australian rules footballer

See also
Bill Carson (disambiguation)
William Carson (disambiguation)
William Karlsson (ice hockey)